Radivoje Ostojić was a Yugoslav basketball player.

Playing career 
During his playing career in the late 1940 and 1950s, Ostojić was on Belgrade-based teams Metalac and Crvena zvezda of the Yugoslav Federal League. During his stint with Crvena zvezda he won two Yugoslav Championships.

Career achievements and awards 
 Yugoslav League champion: 2 (with Crvena zvezda: 1954, 1955).

References

KK Crvena zvezda players
OKK Beograd players
Serbian men's basketball players
Yugoslav men's basketball players
1942 Belgrade Basketball Championship players
Year of birth missing
Year of death missing
Place of birth missing
Place of death missing